The Narval class (sous-marins d'escadre, "fleet submarines") were patrol submarines built for the French Navy in the 1950s.

Design 
The Narval type was an offspring of the E-48 project, inspired by the German Type XXI U-boats of the Second World War, particularly  which were brought into French service.

Compared to the Type XXI, the Narval class introduced an entirely new schnorchel system and novel detection systems, gained 33% in operational range on electric power (compared to the  available to the type XXI), and doubled the test depth. The propellers were also particularly studied to minimise noise.

The hulls of the Narvals were assembled from seven  sections welded together.

The engine were two-stroke diesels made by the French constructor Schneider, which proved unreliable and noisy to the point where the engine section became difficult to man at full power.

From 1966 to 1970, the Narvals underwent extensive modernisation, where their engines were replaced by a diesel-electrical design based on the SEMT-Pielstick 12PA4-185.

Service history 
The Narvals were used to explore limits of submarines performances in several ways.

In 1964,  and  sailed up to the 70th parallel north to prepare the first French attempts at navigation under sea ice. These tests were carried out the next year by Dauphin and  when they spent a week and a half in the 72nd parallel north.

During her last years, from 1980, Requin was fitted with the sonar system planned for the M4 refit of the SNLE. Similarly, Dauphin was extensively modified from 1986 to be used as a test bed for equipment and sensors to be installed on the s, then under design. When finally decommissioned in 1992, she was the oldest submarine in service. She was later expended as a target ship off Toulon.

In 1985, Espadon became the first French submarine used as a museum ship.

Ships

See also
 List of submarines of France

References

 Conway's All the World's Fighting Ships 1947–1995
 Les sous-marins d'escadre type Narval

Submarine classes
 
 
Ship classes of the French Navy